|}

The River Don Novices' Hurdle is a Grade 2 National Hunt hurdle race in Great Britain which is open to horses aged four years or older. It is run at Doncaster Racecourse over a distance of about 3 miles and 110 yards (4,929 metres), and during its running there are eleven hurdles to be jumped. The race is for novice hurdlers, and it is scheduled to take place each year in late January or early February.

The event is named after the River Don which runs through Doncaster. Prior to 2002 the distance of the race was 2 miles and 4 furlongs (4,023 metres), and there were ten hurdles to jump. The race has been sponsored since 2007 by the Albert Bartlett vegetable growing company,

Winners since 1991

See also
 Horseracing in Great Britain
 List of British National Hunt races

References
 Racing Post:
 pedigreequery.com – River Don Novices' Hurdle – Doncaster.

National Hunt races in Great Britain
Doncaster Racecourse
National Hunt hurdle races